Palm City is an unincorporated area and census-designated place (CDP) in Martin County, Florida, United States. The population was 25,883 at the 2020 census. It is part of the Port St. Lucie Metropolitan Statistical Area.

Geography
Palm City is in northeast Martin County and it bordered by North River Shores to the northeast, Stuart, the county seat, to the east, the South Fork of the St. Lucie River to the southeast, Florida's Turnpike to the west and Port St. Lucie in St. Lucie County to the north.

Neighborhoods

 Bay Pointe
 Canoe Creek
 Carmel
 Charter Club
 Cobblestone Country Club
 Copperleaf
 Canopy Creek
 Crane Creek
 Cypress Lake
 Danforth
 Evergreen Golf Club
 Four Rivers
 Fox Run
 Grenada
 Hammock Creek Estates
 Hammock Creek Preserve
 Hammock Creek Sanctuary
 Harbour Pointe
 Harbour Ridge
 Hidden Bay
 Highlands Reserve
 Hunters Creek
 Islesworth
 Lake Grove
 Lake Village, formerly The Crossings
 La Mariposa
 Lighthouse Point
 Martin Downs Country Club
 Monarch Country Club
 Murano
 Naked Lady Ranch Airport 
 Oakbrooke Estates
 Oak Ridge
 Old Palm City
 Orchid Bay
 Palm City Farms
 Palm Cove Golf & Yacht Club
 Palm Isles
 Palm Pointe
 Parkside
 Pelican Cove
 Pine Ridge
 Pipers Landing
 River Landing
 Riverbend
 Rustic Hills
 Seagate Harbor
 Sawgrass Villas
 St. Lucie Shores
 Stratford Downs
 Stuart West
 Sunset Trace
 The Meadows
 Tiburon
 Westwood County Estates
 Whispering Sound
 Windstone
 Woodside

Demographics

2020 census

As of the 2020 United States census, there were 25,883 people, 9,892 households, and 6,799 families residing in the CDP.

2000 census
As of the census of 2000, there were 20,097 people, 8,458 households, and 6,301 families residing in the CDP. The racial makeup of the CDP was 96.56% White, 1.08% African American, 0.13% Native American, 1.03% Asian, 0.40% from other races, and 0.79% from two or more races. Hispanic or Latino of any race were 2.77% of the population.

There were 8,458 households, out of which 27.1% had children under the age of 18 living with them, 66.2% were married couples living together, 6.3% had a female householder with no husband present, and 25.5% were non-families. 21.5% of all households were made up of individuals, and 11.7% had someone living alone who was 65 years of age or older.  The average household size was 2.35 and the average family size was 2.72.

In the CDP, the population was spread out, with 21.1% under the age of 18, 3.3% from 18 to 24, 22.5% from 25 to 44, 25.8% from 45 to 64, and 27.3% who were 65 years of age or older.  The median age was 47 years. For every 100 females, there were 91.9 males.  For every 100 females age 18 and over, there were 89.0 males.

The median income for a household in the CDP was $62,362, and the median income for a family was $69,688 (these figures had risen to $67,546 and $84,000 respectively as of a 2007 estimate). Males had a median income of $48,852 versus $33,699 for females. The per capita income for the CDP was $35,213.  About 2.6% of families and 3.7% of the population were below the poverty line, including 5.3% of those under age 18 and 1.6% of those age 65 or over.

Government
Palm City is an unincorporated town located in Martin County, governed by the Board of County Commissioners. Martin County is divided into 5 districts. Palm City is represented by Ed Ciampi as part of District 5. All governmental functions are carried out by the county offices.

Police protection is provided by the Martin County Sheriff's Office.  The Sheriff's Office provides coverage for most of Martin county from their headquarters in Stuart. 

Fire and EMS services are provided by Station 21 of the Martin County Fire Rescue (Engine 21, Rescue 21, Brush 21, Tanker 21).

Education

Middle schools
Hidden Oaks Middle School

Elementary schools
Bessey Creek Elementary School
Citrus Grove Elementary School
Palm City Elementary School

Private schools
Alphabet Farms (Private Preschool)
Appletree Academy (Private Preschool)
High Hopes (Private Preschool)
Immanuel Early Learning Center (Private Preschool)
Little Peoples Academy (Private Preschool)
Martin Downs Montessori School (Private Preschool/Kindergarten)
Peace Christian Academy (Private K-12)
The Learning Cover (Private Preschool)
United Methodist (Private Preschool)

Libraries
Peter and Julie Cummings Library - Palm City branch of the Martin County Library System

Infrastructure

Transportation
Florida's Turnpike
I-95

Notable people
 Dickey Betts, founding member of The Allman Brothers Band
 Dan Bongino, Republican nominee for U.S. Senate from Maryland in 2012 and for Maryland's 6th congressional district in 2014
 Edgar Cortright, former director of the NASA Langley Research Center and chairman of the Apollo 13 Review Board
 Ken Duke, PGA Tour golfer
 Tom Phoebus, MLB pitcher, Baltimore Orioles, World Series champion, pitched a no-hitter in 1968 against the Boston Red Sox
 Eugene Stoner, inventor of the M16 rifle
 Reidar Waaler, American soldier of Norwegian birth, earned the Medal of Honor

References

Census-designated places in Martin County, Florida
Port St. Lucie metropolitan area
Census-designated places in Florida
Former municipalities in Florida